Eungbongsan is a mountain of Gyeongsangnam-do, southeastern South Korea. It has an elevation of 473 metres (1,552 feet).

See also
List of mountains of Korea

References

Namhae County
Mountains of South Gyeongsang Province
Mountains of South Korea